Kenneth Algernon Black Jr. (December 23, 1932 – January 29, 2019) was an American Republican Party politician who served in the New Jersey General Assembly from District 3A from 1968 to 1974.

Born in Swedesboro, New Jersey and raised in Penns Grove, New Jersey, Black graduated from Penns Grove High School and Rutgers University.

A resident of Wildwood Crest, New Jersey since 1984, he died there on January 29, 2019, at age 86.

References

1932 births
2019 deaths
Penns Grove High School alumni
People from Penns Grove, New Jersey
People from Swedesboro, New Jersey
People from Wildwood Crest, New Jersey
Politicians from Cape May County, New Jersey
Politicians from Salem County, New Jersey
Republican Party members of the New Jersey General Assembly
Rutgers University alumni